Christopher Rowe, is an American record producer, audio engineer and guitarist specializing in country rock. He is best known for his work with Taylor Swift.

Career 
Rowe began his career working as a guitarist on folk, new age, and ethnological records before moving into country music as an assistant engineer and editor. He was part of the production team for the Dixie Chicks album Fly.

In 2021, Rowe worked with Taylor Swift for her two re-recorded albums Fearless (Taylor's Version) and Red (Taylor's Version), which he served as the producer, engineer and vocal engineer of these albums.

Partial discography 

Source:

References 

Living people
Date of birth unknown
People from Nashville, Tennessee
American record producers
American country record producers
American audio engineers
Year of birth missing (living people)